Fenglinshi Township(), is a rural township in Liling City, Zhuzhou City, Hunan Province, People's Republic of China.

Cityscape
The township is divided into 9 villages, the following areas: Tangjia'ao Village, Wushi Village, Fenglinshi Village, Baimeichong Village, Majiachong Village, Huang Village, Jiangjiaqiao Village, Xiaojiachong Village, and Taiyangqiao Village.

References

Historic township-level divisions of Liling